Mohammed Al-Maazuz (born 1959) is a Moroccan scholar and writer. He has a PhD in Political Anthropology from the Sorbonne in Paris and another PhD in Arabic Thought (Philosophy) from Mohammed V University in Rabat. He is a prolific author in the field of political anthropology. He is also an award-winning novelist. His 2007 novel The Flutter of Seasons won the Moroccan Book Prize. A more recent novel What Sin Caused Her to Die? was nominated for the Arabic Booker Prize.

Selected works
 Islam and Politics (2001) 
 Aesthetics in Classical Arabic Thought (2002) 
 Political Preoccupations: Documenting Standpoints (2016)
 The Flutter of Seasons (novel) 
 What Sin Caused Her to Die? (novel)

References

Moroccan novelists
Paris-Sorbonne University alumni
Mohammed V University alumni
Living people
1959 births